Evgeny Donskoy won the title, defeating Alessio di Mauro 2–6, 6–3, 6–3 in the final.

Seeds

Draw

Finals

Top half

Bottom half

References
 Main draw
 Qualifying draw

2011 Singles
Casablanca,Singles